The Bangor-class minesweepers were a class of warships operated by the Royal Navy (RN), Royal Canadian Navy (RCN), Imperial Japanese Navy (IJN), and Royal Indian Navy (RIN) during the Second World War.

The class derives its name from the lead ship, which was launched on 19 February 1940 and commissioned on 7 November of that year. Royal Navy ships were named after coastal towns of the United Kingdom.

Their lack of size gave vessels of the class poor sea handling abilities, reportedly worse even than the s. The diesel-engined versions were considered to have poorer handling characteristics than the slow-speed reciprocating-engined variants. Their shallow draught made them unstable and their short hulls tended to bury the bow when operating in a head sea.

The Bangor-class vessels were also considered overcrowded, cramming six officers and over 90 ratings into a vessel originally intended for a total of 40.

Design and development

The need for quick construction coupled with the limitations of engineering resources resulted in several variations existing based on the availability of propulsion machinery. The ships all had twin screws, but the machinery was a mix of steam turbine, slow-speed steam reciprocating, high-speed steam reciprocating and diesel. The diesel powered examples were about  shorter than the rest as they had no need for boiler rooms. Displacement varied with propulsion machinery from 590 to 672 tons. The reciprocating engine powered Bangors were also known as the Blyth class and the steam turbine powered versions as the Ardrossan class.

The class was considered cramped for the purposes it was built for, with not enough room provided for the acoustic and magnetic minesweeping gear carried.

Ships in class

Diesel-engined

Turbine-engined

Reciprocating-engined

See also
List of ship classes of World War II

References and notes

 Warships of World War II, by H. T. Lenton & J. J. Colledge, pub. Ian Allan Ltd.

External links 

 Bangor class minesweepers at uboat.net
 Canadian Bangor class at hazegray.org
 Japanese Minesweepers Combinedfleet.com
 Japanese Minesweepers Combinedfleet.com

  
Mine warfare vessel classes
Ship classes of the Royal Navy